Natasa Lappa (born 10 February 2001) is a Cypriot windsurfer and sailor.

She represented Cyprus in the 2020 Tokyo Summer Olympics, one of 15 Cypriot athletes competing in the Games that year. She ranked 21st in the RS:X Women windsurfing event. 

She is a member of The Limassol Nautical Club.

References

External links
 
 

2001 births
Living people
Cypriot windsurfers
Female windsurfers
Cypriot female sailors (sport)
Olympic sailors of Cyprus
Sailors at the 2020 Summer Olympics – RS:X
Cypriot Christians